The Fermanagh Senior Football Championship is an annual Gaelic Athletic Association club competition between the top Gaelic football clubs in Fermanagh. The winners of the Fermanagh Championship qualify to represent their county in the Ulster Senior Club Football Championship, the winners of which go on to the All-Ireland Senior Club Football Championship. Enniskillen Gaels are the 2022 champions.

Winners listed by club

Finals listed by year

References

External links
 Official Fermanagh GAA Website
 Fermanagh at ClubGAA

 
Senior Gaelic football county championships